Fishing in Turkey is a sector within the economy of Turkey contributing .3% of its total GDP as of 2002. In 2018, the seafood sector provided employment to 52,937 people and produced .6 million tons of fish. According to the OECD, this produced a value of USD 1481 million.

Turkey is surrounded by seas on three sides and has a coastline of 8,333 km, and its natural lakes make up approximately 10,000 km 2, with 3,442 km 2 of reservoirs, and 178,000 km rivers. Per capita fish consumption is low in Turkey despite being surrounded by seas.

Distribution

Geography 
Fishing is carried out in the Turkish territorial waters of the Black Sea, Aegean Sea and the Mediterranean, in the Sea of Marmara and the straits (Bosphorus and Dardanelles) and inland waters. The coastline of Turkey, surrounded by seas on three sides, is 8,333 km. Territorial waters are 12 miles out from the Mediterranean and Black Seas coastlines, and 6 miles out in the Aegean Sea. The Marmara and the Turkish Straits with an area of 11,500 km 2 are considered Turkey's inland waters. Its natural lakes are approximately 10,000 km 2, with 3,442 km 2 of reservoirs, and 178,000 km rivers. Fishing in the Aegean Sea is mainly coastal.

Species 
200 fish species live in the Sea of Marmara, 300 in the Aegean Sea, 247 in the Black Sea, and 500 in the Mediterranean. There are about 100 fish species that have economic value and are caught. Commercially caught fish include anchovy, sardine, mackerel, bonito, sprat, haddock, bream mackerel, and bluefish. Freshwater fishing includes ice fishing in Lake Çıldır.

Overfishing and climate change 
The Black Sea is overfished but not as much as it was previously. Anchovy stocks have decreased, with Ordu University Professor Mehmet Aydın blaming overfishing by Georgia. The Mediterranean is overfished but not at lower levels compared to some years ago. There is also Lessepsian migration from the Red Sea.

Some fish have become extinct in the Sea of Marmara. It has a problem of marine mucilage.

The distribution of fish is changing due to climate change, for example flying gurnard have moved north into the Dardenelles.

Domestic consumption 

Per capita fish consumption is very low in Turkey, despite being on a peninsula surrounded by the sea on three sides. Annual fish consumption in Turkey is 8 kg(is that just aq?), the world average is 16 kg, EU average 26 kg. The reasons for low fish consumption include a lower income level compared to other countries with larger seafood consumption, a high population with low domestic production, fluctuating seafood prices, and a strong cultural preference for fresh fish.

In 2018 600 thousand tonnes of fish (including molluscs and crustaceans) were produced, worth USD 1481 million. 76% of this value came from aquaculture and 24% from fisheries. In 2018 twice as much was exported as imported: there were 15 thousand ships totalling 170 thousand tonnes 90% of which were shorter than 12 m. Most government support was for management, control and surveillance and infrastructure.

Aquaculture 
Aquaculture, which started in the 1970s, has been supported by the government since 2003. Sea bass and sea bream are farmed, and mostly trout in inland waters. Aquaculture overtook fishing in 2020, with Muğla, İzmir and Elazığ being the top provinces. In 2021 $1.2 billion worth of farmed fish were exported.

References

 
Black Sea